During the 2001–02 English football season, West Ham United F.C. competed in the FA Premier League (known as the FA Barclaycard Premiership for sponsorship reasons).

Final league table

Players

First-team squad
Squad at end of season

Left club during season

Reserve squad
The following players did not appear for the first team this season.

Results

Premier League

League Cup

FA Cup

Statistics

Overview

Goalscorers

League position by matchday

Appearances and goals

|-
! colspan=14 style=background:#dcdcdc; text-align:center| Goalkeepers

|-
! colspan=14 style=background:#dcdcdc; text-align:center| Defenders

|-
! colspan=14 style=background:#dcdcdc; text-align:center| Midfielders

|-
! colspan=14 style=background:#dcdcdc; text-align:center| Forwards

|-
! colspan=14 style=background:#dcdcdc; text-align:center| Players transferred out during the season

|}

Transfers

In

Out

Notes

References

West Ham United
West Ham United F.C. seasons
West Ham United
West Ham United